Joseph Darling may refer to:

Joe Darling (1870–1946), Australian cricketer 
Joseph Robinson Darling (1872–1957), United States Department of Justice, author, promoter, explorer, and soldier of fortune